This is a list of members of the Senate of Canada in the 41st Canadian Parliament.

The province of Quebec has 24 Senate divisions which are constitutionally mandated. In all other provinces, a Senate division is strictly an optional designation of the senator's own choosing, and has no real constitutional or legal standing. A senator who does not choose a special senate division is designated a senator for the province at large.

Names in bold indicate senators in the 28th Canadian Ministry.

List of senators

Resignations, retirements, deaths, and floor crossing

Left Senate during the 41st Parliament

Changes in party affiliation during the 41st Parliament

Party standings since the election
The party standings have changed as follows since the election of the 41st Parliament on May 2, 2011:

See also
List of House members of the 41st Parliament of Canada
Women in the 41st Canadian Parliament
List of current Canadian senators

References

External links

41
41st Canadian Parliament